Liberty Grove is an unincorporated community in Randolph County, Alabama, United States.

Notes

Unincorporated communities in Randolph County, Alabama
Unincorporated communities in Alabama